
Gmina Rudnik is a rural gmina (administrative district) in Krasnystaw County, Lublin Voivodeship, in eastern Poland.

Villages
Gmina Rudnik contains the villages and settlements of Bzowiec, Joanin, Kaszuby, Majdan Borowski Pierwszy, Majdan Kobylański, Majdan Łuczycki, Majdan Średni, Maszów, Maszów Dolny, Maszów Górny, Międzylas, Mościska, Mościska-Kolonia, Płonka, Płonka Poleśna, Płonka-Kolonia, Potasznia, Równianki, Rudnik, Rudnik-Romanówek, Suche Lipie, Suszeń and Wierzbica.

Neighbouring gminas
Gmina Rudnik is bordered by the gminas of Gorzków, Izbica, Nielisz, Sułów, Turobin and Żółkiewka.

References
Polish official population figures 2006

Rudnik
Gmina Rudnik